Levi Buell Nelson (May 4, 1838 in Chemung County, New York – August 28, 1903 in Atlanta), was an Atlanta, Georgia city councilman, founder of the Gate City Street Railroad Company.

Nelson worked in Cortland, New York, then Toledo, Iowa, before serving in the Union Army during the Civil War. In 1881 he came to Atlanta with his former real estate partner C.P. N. Barker. They invested in farmland in Georgia. Nelson was elected to Atlanta city council and served on the sanitary, relief and water works committees.  His home, "one of the handsomest homes in Atlanta" on Boulevard in today's Old Fourth Ward, then an elegant avenue of mansions, burned down in the Great Atlanta fire of 1917. In 1921 the 6-acre site was acquired by Atlanta Medical Center for its present location.

References

Atlanta City Council members
1838 births
1903 deaths
People from Chemung County, New York
People from Cortland, New York
People from Toledo, Iowa
19th-century American politicians